Virgilio Delgado Teixeira (26 October 1917 – 5 December 2010) was a Portuguese film, television and stage actor, known for roles in Portuguese, Spanish and American films. He was known as a Portuguese "heartthrob" and a leading actor during the 1940s, 1950s and 1960s.

Teixeira was born in Funchal, Madeira, on 26 October 1917. He began his career in Portuguese and Spanish cinema before taking roles in Hollywood productions. Teixeira made his film debut in the 1943 film, Ave de Arribação. In 1948, Teixeira portrayed Julio, the love interest of Amalia Rodrigues's character, in Fado, História de uma Cantadeira, which was directed by Perdigão Queiroga. His later work in Portuguese film and television included A Mulher do Próximo in 1982 and the telenovela, Chuva na Areia, in 1984.

Teixeira's Hollywood credits included roles in Alexander the Great, Return of the Seven, and Doctor Zhivago.

Additionally, Teixeira served as the first director of the Centro das Comunidades Madeirenses.

Virgilio Teixeira died in Funchal, Madeira, of respiratory problems on 5 December 2010, at the age of 93. He was survived by his wife, Vanda Teixeira. President of the Regional Government of Madeira Alberto João Jardim called Teixeira a "Great Madeiran" following his death.

Selected filmography

 O Costa do Castelo (1943)
 Ave de Arribação (1943) - The fisherman
 Um Homem às Direitas (1945) - José
 A Noiva do Brasil (1945) - Manuel de Medeiros, first
 José do Telhado (1945) - José do Telhado
 Cero en conducta (1945) - Siqueira
 Cais do Sodré (1946) - Toino Ventura
 Ladrão, Precisa-se!... (1946) - José
 La mantilla de Beatriz (1946) - D. Luis de Meneses
 The Holy Queen (1947) - Alfonso Sánchez
 Três Espelhos (1947) - Miguel
 Fado, História d'uma Cantadeira (1947) - Júlio Guitarrista
 Extraño amanecer (1948)
 Amanhã Como Hoje (1948) - (uncredited)
 El verdugo (1948)
 Uma Vida para Dois (1949) - Mário Vilar
 Heróis do Mar (1949) - João Manuel
 The Bad Lord Byron (1949) - Pietro Gamba
 Ribatejo (1949) - António, the bulls' wrangler
 A Volta de José do Telhado (1949) - José do Telhado
 Flor de lago (1950)
 Yo no soy la Mata-Hari (1950) - Richard / Tte. Jorjof
 Agustina of Aragon (1950) - Juan, el Bravo
 Vendaval (1950) - Capitán Mir
 Saturday Night (1950) - Nunú
 Torturados (1950) - Raúl
 The Lioness of Castille (1951) - Pedro de Guzmán
 Dawn of America (1951) - Pedro de Arana
 Lola the Coalgirl (1952) - Capitán Gustavo Lefevre
 Devil's Roundup (1952) - Ángel
 Nazaré (1952) - António 'Tonho' Manata
 La hija del mar (1953) - Tomás Pedro
 Cañas y barro (1954) - Tonet
 Zalacaín el aventurero (1955) - Martín Zalacaín
 La hermana alegría (1955)
 Father Cigarette (1955)
 Nubes de verano (1955) - Carlos
 Un día perdido (1955) - Andrés
 Alexander the Great (1956) - Ptolemy
 Perdeu-se um Marido (1957) - Eduardo
 Dois Dias no Paraíso (1957) - Eduardo Pimentel
 La estrella del rey (1957) - Leopoldo
 Polvorilla (1957)
 The 7th Voyage of Sinbad (1958) - Ali
 La Tirana (1958) - Francisco de Goya y Lucientes
 Habanera (1958)
 The Redeemer (1959) - Saint John
 Carta al cielo (1959)
 Solomon and Sheba (1959) - (uncredited)
 Tommy the Toreador (1959) - Parilla, the Bullfighter
 The Boy Who Stole a Million (1960) - Miguel
 Julia y el celacanto (1961) - Juan
 El Cid (1961) - (uncredited)
 The Happy Thieves (1961) - Cayetano the Bullfighter (credited as Virgilio Texera)
 Rosa de Lima (1961) - Dimas
 The Balcony of the Moon (1962) - Domingo de Triana
 Face of Terror (1962) - Matt Wilder
 Usted tiene ojos de mujer fatal (1962)
 Duel at the Rio Grande (1963) - Sacerdote
 Los conquistadores del Pacífico (1963)
 The Fall of the Roman Empire (1964) - Marcellus
 Ella y el miedo (1964) - Esteban Ruiz
 Saul e David (1964) - Abner
 Passagem de Nível (1965) - Eduardo
 Doctor Zhivago (1965) - Captain (uncredited)
 A Voz do Sangue (1966) - João do Souto
 A Man Could Get Killed (1966) - Inspector Rodrigues
 The Sea Pirate (1966) - Decrees
 Return of the Seven (1966) - Luis Emilio Delgado
 Il grande colpo di Surcouf (1966) - Decrees
 The Magnificent Two (1967) - General Carrillo
 Batida de raposas (1976) - Germán
 Tricheurs (1984) - Toni
 O Crime de Simão Bolandas (1984) - D.Lourenço
 A Mulher do Próximo (1988) - Antonio
 Eternidade (1992) - Álvaro
 Vertigem (1992) - Luís Gouveia

References

External links

1917 births
2010 deaths
People from Funchal
Madeiran actors
Portuguese male film actors
Portuguese male stage actors
Portuguese Roman Catholics
20th-century Portuguese male actors
Portuguese expatriates in the United States
Expatriate male actors in the United States